Suk Bahadur Thapa is a Burmese footballer who served as the major for 4th Infantry Battalion (4th Gurkha) of Myanmar Army. He was also a dominating tennis and field hockey player as well as the national 100-meter sprint champion which he held under 11 seconds. Bahadur is a Gurkha from the Shan State in Myanmar.

Early days
In 1952, Myanmar Football Federation launched inaugural States and Divisions Football Championship to draw out talented footballers from around the country. Along with many new faces, Bahadur was selected from title winning Shan state football team. Later he played for Army football team where he teamed up with future national teammates; Hla Maung, Ba Kyu, Maung Thaung, Hla Aye, Guan Shein, Ba Shwe, David Kyaw San.

Personal life
Bahadur is married to Khin Than Myint.

Honours
The following is a list of championships achieved during his captaincy.

Burma
 Asian Games Gold medal: 1966, 1970; Bronze medal: 1954
 AFC Asian Cup runner-up: 1968
 SEA Games: 1965, 1967, 1969
 Merdeka Cup: 1964, 1967
 King's Cup runner-up: 1968

References

1935 births
2001 deaths
Burmese male sprinters
Burmese footballers
Myanmar international footballers
Asian Games medalists in football
Footballers at the 1954 Asian Games
Footballers at the 1966 Asian Games
Footballers at the 1970 Asian Games
Asian Games gold medalists for Myanmar
Asian Games bronze medalists for Myanmar
1968 AFC Asian Cup players
Burmese people of Nepalese descent
People from Mandalay Region
Association football forwards
Association football wingers
Burmese Hindus
Southeast Asian Games medalists in football
Southeast Asian Games gold medalists for Myanmar
Medalists at the 1954 Asian Games
Medalists at the 1966 Asian Games
Medalists at the 1970 Asian Games
Competitors at the 1967 Southeast Asian Peninsular Games